An election for the leadership of Kadima was held on 17 September 2008 as a concession to Kadima's coalition partner, Labour, which had threatened to bring down the government if Prime Minister Ehud Olmert didn't stand aside following police investigations into alleged corruption during his terms as minister and as mayor of Jerusalem.

As Kadima remained the largest party in the Knesset and the coalition, Foreign Minister Tzipi Livni, the designated new leader after balloting, had the chance to form a government without a need for elections.

The election was the party's first official leadership election. Previously, in 2006, there had been a leadership vote, but it was for interim leader.

Candidates 
 Tzipi Livni, foreign minister of israel
 Avi Dichter, Internal Security Minister
 Shaul Mofaz, Transport Minister
 Meir Sheetrit, Minister of the Interior

Campaign 
On 28 July 2008 Livni announced that she would challenge Prime Minister Olmert for party leadership. Olmert was being politically dragged down by corruption investigations. Livni argued that the party had been misled under Olmert's leadership On 30 July Olmert announced that he had against seeking reelection as party leader and prime minister.

The two front-runners throughout the campaign consistently remained Mofaz and Livni, with Livni always holding a consistent lead in the polls. 

While both frontrunners supported a two-state solution, Mofaz attacked Livni for wanting to divide Jerusalem in a final peace deal with the Palestinians, and claimed that his military experience would make him a more qualified Prime Minister. Livni and her supporters claimed that a vote for Mofaz is the same as a vote for the Likud due to Mofaz's hawkish and more right-wing positions. Livni also enjoyed a "clean" reputation, being seen as having honesty and integrity, and being free from corruption allegations. Outgoing Prime Minister Ehud Olmert remained neutral in the primary, but was alleged to privately favor Mofaz.

Results 
Exit polls released after the poll indicated a double-digit victory for Livni. The actual vote count turned out much closer, amid very low turnout, with Shaul Mofaz coming within a few hundred votes of winning an unexpected victory over Livni. Supporters of Mofaz called for a recount but Mofaz rejected any legal challenge of the declared result and called Livni to congratulate her on her victory, as did Sheetrit and Dichter.

Aftermath 
After Mofaz's loss, he announced that he would be taking a break from politics and leaving the government and Knesset. However, he would remain a member of Kadima. Soon after, however, he rescinded his statement, and went on to win the 2nd place in Kadima's Knesset list for the 2009 election. In a rematch in 2012, he won the leadership, and in the 2013 election led the party to a stunning collapse, winning 2 seats.

After her election, Livni failed to form a governing coalition, having failed to reach an agreement with Shas. Subsequently Knesset elections were held on 10 February 2009.

See also
2012 Kadima leadership election
2012 Likud leadership election

References

External links
Kadima Leadership Elections: background, results, and the prospects for peace Institute for Middle East Understanding

Kadima leadership
September 2008 events in Asia
2008
Kadima leadership election